Mohammad Khouja (born March 15, 1982) is a Saudi Arabian retired footballer.

Career
At club level, Khouja played for the Al-Shabab football club based in Riyadh. A goalkeeper, he also has 8 international caps with the Saudi Arabia national team, participating in the 2006 FIFA World Cup.

References

Saudi Arabian footballers
Saudi Arabia international footballers
1982 births
Living people
2006 FIFA World Cup players
Association football goalkeepers
Al-Shabab FC (Riyadh) players
Ettifaq FC players
Ohod Club players
Saudi Professional League players
People from Medina